State Route 20 (SR 20) is a  state highway in the northern part of the U.S. state of Alabama. It travels from the Tennessee state line, where it continues as Tennessee State Route 69, northwest of Florence, east to Interstate 65 (I-65), east of Decatur. It crosses the Tennessee River at Florence (with US 43, US 72, SR 17, and SR 157) and also at Decatur (with US 31 and US 72 Alt.)

US 72 Alt. follows SR 20 from the intersection with US 72 at Muscle Shoals to I-65 east of Decatur, the entire stretch being four-laned.

Route description
SR 20 begins in Waterloo at the Tennessee state line. It junctions with the Natchez Trace Parkway and enters Florence. In Florence, the route junctions with SR 133. It continues south to parallel the Tennessee River, heading east for just a mile as Coffee Road before junctioning with US 72 and US 43 at a Parclo. It crosses the Tennessee River with the two routes, SR 17, and SR 13. This is a quintuple concurrency.

The routes enter Colbert County and Tuscumbia. The routes junction with SR 184. They pass by a few restaurants and a Planet Pepsi building near this junction. The routes reach Muscle Shoals. Here, US 43/SR 17/SR 13 and US 72 turn to the south and west respectively, while SR 20 turns east with U.S. 72 Alt. The two routes junction with SR 133 again and SR 157. This is the southern terminus of SR 133 and the continuation of SR 157. The two routes split off at Leighton. SR 157 continues south to Moulton and Cullman along the right-of-way. US 72 Alt. and SR 20 turn to the direct east/west and eventually enter Lawrence County.

The routes enter Town Creek and junction with AL-101. The routes continue to Courtland and then junction with SR 33. This stretch of road is mostly flat. The routes continue east to the Morgan County line and enter Trinity.

The stretch between here and SR 67 is well-known for containing multiple industrial plants, such as 3M and Nucor. The routes junction with SR 67 and gain the Corridor V name. The routes pass through Decatur, junctioning with US 31. This junction is limited because there is no direct connection between US 31 north and SR 20 west. Traffic making that connection must use a short side road onto a short one-way street, which leads to SR 20. The routes continue north across the Tennessee River again and enter Limestone County.

The routes lose US 31 at a Directional-T Interchange (road) and continue east to I-65. I-565 begins at this point. US 72 Alt. continues along I-565 to Huntsville, and this is the end of SR 20.

Old SR 20, (also known as old highway 20) starts at the I-65 and I-565 interchange, it follows the same route as I-565 until the exit at Mooresville, and at exit 7 also follows the same route as Madison Boulevard, and is the original road section that once served by SR 20, it ends after 5.8 miles (9.4 kilometers) at exit 13 at the 3 way intersection with Governors west.

History

SR 20 was started when Alabama renumbered SR 41 with a statewide renumbering in 1929. The original route passed from US 72 at Muscle Shoals to US 31 at Decatur. This portion was named the Joe Wheeler Highway, and markers commemorating this are still located on East (Decatur at Railroad/Church Streets) and West (Tuscumbia-Old Lee Highway) ends. In 1931, SR 20 replaced SR 2 following US 72 west to the Mississippi state line west of Margerum, and in 1936 it was extended east to Huntsville.

1957 saw many changes to SR 20. It was replaced again by SR 2 along US 72 to the Mississippi state line, and, in turn, SR 20 replaced SR 2 traveling north to Florence and northwest of Florence to the Tennessee state line, forming a route popularly known as New Savannah Highway. SR 20 was also realigned to a much more direct route between Decatur and Huntsville, bypassing the town of Madison.

Beginning in the early 1980s, the eastern terminus of SR 20 began retreating to the west. The original terminus was at Clinton Avenue and US 231/US 431 in downtown Huntsville. With the construction of I-565 in the early 1990s along the route of SR 20 east of I-65, SR 20 was slowly pulled back to its current terminus at the junction of I-65 and becomes I-565.

Major intersections

Historic routes
Several sections of Old Highway 20 still exist:
 Lauderdale County Road 200 through Sullivans Crossroads, Central Heights, Lovelace and McGee Town, known as Old Savannah Highway.
 Lauderdale County Road 14 from McGee Town to Florence
 Colbert County Road 22 through Leighton.
 Jefferson Street through Courtland
 Old Trinity Road between Trinity and Decatur
 Old Highway 20 through Mooresville – The section east of Mooresville is part of the 1957 alignment.
 1936 Alignment
 Mooresville Road north of Mooresville through Belle Mina to Old Highway 20.
 Old Highway 20 east through Greenbrier to County Line Road.
 County Line Road north to Palmer Road.
 Palmer Road east to Downtown Madison.
 Old Madison Pike from Madison to I-565 exit 15.
 1957 Alignment
 Madison Boulevard from I-565 exit 5 to I-565 exit 13.
 Governors Drive in Huntsville from I-565 exit 17 to Clinton Avenue.
 Clinton Avenue in Huntsville to US 231/US 431, Memorial Parkway.

Corridor V
Corridor V is part of the Appalachian Development Highway System and follows the path of SR 20 between Decatur and the eastern Terminus at I-65.

See also

References

External links

 

020
Decatur metropolitan area, Alabama
Huntsville-Decatur, AL Combined Statistical Area
Florence–Muscle Shoals metropolitan area
Transportation in Lauderdale County, Alabama
Transportation in Colbert County, Alabama
Transportation in Lawrence County, Alabama
Transportation in Morgan County, Alabama
Transportation in Limestone County, Alabama